Patrick Lemasle (born 18 May 1952) was a member of the National Assembly of France from 2002 to 2017.  He represented the  7th constituency of the Haute-Garonne department,
as a member of the Socialiste, radical, citoyen et divers gauche.

He was a member of the Finance Committee.

References

1952 births
Living people
Socialist Party (France) politicians
Deputies of the 12th National Assembly of the French Fifth Republic
Deputies of the 13th National Assembly of the French Fifth Republic
Deputies of the 14th National Assembly of the French Fifth Republic